James Ponder (October 31, 1819 – November 5, 1897) was an American merchant and politician from Milton in Sussex County, Delaware. He was a member of the Democratic Party, who served in the Delaware General Assembly and as Governor of Delaware.

Early life and family
Ponder was born near Milton, Delaware, son of John and Hester Milby Ponder. He married Sallie Waples in 1851 and had four children: Ida, John, James Waples, and Anna. They lived at 414 Federal Street and were members of St. John the Baptist Episcopal Church in Milton. He inherited his father's business and expanded it into shipbuilding, agriculture, and banking.

Professional and political career
Ponder was elected to the state house for the 1857/58 session and then to the state senate for the 1865/66 and 1867/68 sessions. He was Speaker during the 1867/68 session. In 1870 he was elected Governor of Delaware, defeating the Republican candidate, Thomas Boone Coursey. He served from January 17, 1871 until January 19, 1875.

The election of 1870 was the first opportunity for African-Americans to vote in Delaware elections, and Ponder's tenure was marred by an ongoing response to this change. Ponder himself was in no way sympathetic, saying to the General Assembly that the Federal government was wrong in extending the franchise to "uneducated Negroes." The 1870 election featured rigged voter lists that effectively denied the vote to most African-Americans, and resulted in all the seats in the General Assembly going to the Democratic Party. Two years later, in response, U.S. President Ulysses S. Grant sent in federal troops to police the elections, winning a few elections for Republicans, but undoubtedly prolonging the bitterness felt towards the federal government and their Republican followers in Delaware. The immediate result was the passage of a poll tax and the "Assessment Act of 1873," that effectively allowed tax collectors the ability to remove people from voter list, allegedly for not paying their taxes, and made it enormously complicated for the voter to have their name restored.

Ponder's term also featured the expansion of state offices into all of what is now known as the "old State House," and a thorough going restoration that included the first installation of heating and gas lights. The most controversial action of the term was Ponder's appointment of his brother-in-law, former U.S. Senator Willard Saulsbury as Chancellor of Delaware. Saulsbury had left the Senate as a disgraced alcoholic, and promised Ponder he would change his ways if he was appointed. Evidently Saulsbury kept his promise.

Death and legacy
Ponder died at Milton and is buried there in the Methodist Episcopal Cemetery.

The Gov. James Ponder House at Milton was added to the National Register of Historic Places in 1973.

Almanac
Elections are held the first Tuesday after November 1. Members of the Delaware General Assembly took office the first Tuesday of January. State senators have a four-year term and state representatives have a two-year term. The governor takes office the third Tuesday of January and has a four-year term.

References

Images
Hall of Governors Portrait Gallery Portrait courtesy of Historical and Cultural Affairs, Dover.

External links
Biographical Directory of the Governors of the United States
Delaware’s Governors

The Political Graveyard

Places with more information
Delaware Historical Society; website; 505 North Market Street, Wilmington, Delaware 19801; (302) 655-7161
University of Delaware; Library website; 181 South College Avenue, Newark, Delaware 19717; (302) 831-2965

1819 births
1897 deaths
19th-century American Episcopalians
People from Milton, Delaware
Businesspeople from Delaware
Democratic Party members of the Delaware House of Representatives
Democratic Party Delaware state senators
Democratic Party governors of Delaware
Burials in Sussex County, Delaware
Saulsbury family
19th-century American politicians
19th-century American businesspeople